Einar Kristiansen  (18 June 1882 – 1965) was a Norwegian nordic skiing athlete who won the Holmenkollen medal in 1908.

References
Holmenkollen medalists - click Holmenkollmedaljen for downloadable pdf file 

Holmenkollen medalists
1882 births
1965 deaths